The men's doubles tournament at the 1990 US Open was held from August 27 to September 9, 1990, on the outdoor hard courts of the USTA National Tennis Center in New York City, United States. Pieter Aldrich and Danie Visser won the title, defeating Paul Annacone and David Wheaton in the final.

Seeds

Draw

Finals

Top half

Section 1

Section 2

Bottom half

Section 3

Section 4

External links
 Main draw
1990 US Open – Men's draws and results at the International Tennis Federation

Men's Doubles
US Open (tennis) by year – Men's doubles